Professional sports teams based in Utah encompass multiple teams including the NBA's Utah Jazz, Major League Soccer's Real Salt Lake and Major League Rugby's Utah Warriors.

Current teams

Historical teams

American Football

Baseball

Men’s Basketball

Utah Valor 
(2018-Present)       The Basketball Tournament(TBT)

Women’s Basketball

Ice Hockey

Indoor American Football

Indoor Soccer

In-line Hockey

Rugby

Men’s Soccer

Women’s Soccer

Ultimate

Volleyball

The use of the letter "Z" 
The professional sports team nicknames are often noted for the unusual frequency of the letter Z appearing in team nicknames (such as the Utah Jazz). This phenomenon reached the peak of its popularity during the 1990s; however, several Utah teams continue to make use of the letter Z. At least ten Utah-based professional sports franchises have used team names that include the letter Z, some of which are intentionally spelled incorrectly, using the Z unnecessarily or as a replacement for another letter. Commenting on the proliferation of such team names, New York Times sportswriter Alan Schwarz called Utah "the state where sports fans go to get their Z's." Local television stations KJZZ-TV (which was owned by Larry H. Miller from 1993 until his estate sold the station in 2016) and KPNZ also played off the Jazz's name to end their calls with Z's.

Early Utah -zz teams
The popularity of the Z in Utah sports was likely inspired in part by the unusual nickname of the Utah Jazz NBA team, which in 1979 relocated from New Orleans —which is noted for jazz music— to Salt Lake City, which is not. Up until the early 1990s, Utah's other professional teams used somewhat conventional nicknames (such as the Stars, Golden Eagles, and Trappers).

With the arrival of the Salt Lake Buzz in 1994, the similarity of the nicknames "Buzz" and "Jazz" was unmistakable (although the name "Buzz" was really a play on the name of owner Joe Buzas, as well as a nod to Utah's "Beehive State" moniker). The following year, the Utah Grizzlies minor league hockey team also entered the market.

Utah becomes a -zz market

The announcement of the Utah Starzz WNBA franchise in 1996 cemented the state's propensity for using the letter Z in its team names.
 The peculiar "Starzz" nickname was an homage to the Jazz (as well as to the old Utah Stars ABA team). The precedent firmly set, several -zz teams entered the Utah market in subsequent years, to include the Utah Catzz, Utah Freezz, and Utah Blitzz.

From 1994 to 1999, at least seven professional sports teams in the state adopted nicknames containing a double Z (see table below). All of these team names ended in -zz, except the Utah Grizzlies (which are also commonly called "the Grizz"). With the exception of the Jazz and Grizzlies, none of the -zz teams remain in Utah today, each having relocated, folded, or renamed the franchise.

The Ogden Raptors (1994–present) were the only notable Utah pro franchise to forgo use of the letter Z when entering the Utah market during the 1990s. The Raptors offered this as a selling point, using the slogan "All the fun without the ZZs!" Since 2000, new and renamed franchises have tended to steer away from the Z naming fad, opting instead for names such as Salt Lake Bees, Utah Flash, Real Salt Lake, and Utah Royals FC. However, the creation of the Orem Owlz in 2005 and the Utah Blaze in 2006 provide some indication that Utah's Z nicknaming trend continues.

Notes:
 The Ogden Raptors previously played as Salt Lake City Trappers from 1985 to 1992.
 The Orem Owlz previously played as Provo Angels from 2001–2004, taking its name from the parent Anaheim Angels franchise. The Owlz' last season playing in Orem was 2019; the team had planned to play in 2020, but the 2020 season of all leagues in Minor League Baseball (MiLB) was not played due to COVID-19. After the contraction of MiLB in 2021, the Owlz were purchased by a Colorado-based group; the team was on hiatus for the 2021 season before resuming in 2022 as the Windsor-based Northern Colorado Owlz.
 The Salt Lake Buzz, Stingers, and Bees are various names for the same Pacific Coast League team.
 After the 2020 NWSL season, Utah Royals FC folded amid a controversy surrounding the principal owner of its parent club, Real Salt Lake, that led to that team's sale. The Royals' player-related assets were assumed by a new ownership group in Kansas City. Following the closure of Real Salt Lake's sale in 2022, the new owners have the option to revive the Royals franchise in 2023.

See also
List of developmental and minor sports leagues
Professional sports leagues in the United States
Sports in the United States

References

Utah

Professional sports teams in Utah